Matthew Chan Ching Him (born 18 April 1998) is a Hong Kong professional footballer who currently plays as a centre back for Hong Kong Premier League club Sham Shui Po.

Club career
Chan made his professional debut for Southern on 3 December 2017 in a Sapling Cup match against Kitchee.

On 20 October 2020, Chan was named as one of 17 new players for Pegasus.

In August 2021, Chan joined HK U23.

On 8 August 2022, Chan joined Sham Shui Po.

Honours

International
Hong Kong
 Guangdong-Hong Kong Cup: 2019

References

External links

HKFA

1998 births
Living people
Hong Kong footballers
Association football defenders
Southern District FC players
Eastern Sports Club footballers
TSW Pegasus FC players
Sham Shui Po SA players
HK U23 Football Team players
Hong Kong Premier League players